Poulus Johannes "Poul" de Haan (born 5 October 1947) is a retired Dutch coxswain. Together with Hadriaan van Nes and Jan van de Graaff he won the world title in 1966 in the coxed pair event and placed fourth in 1967. 

Since 1965 de Haan lives in Delft, where he received a degree in civil engineering (specialization environmental engineering). He worked in the areas of soil remediation and water management for Rijkswaterstaat and Rotterdam city authorities until retiring in 2012. He remains involved with rowing as a coach for the Laga club, and is also active as a local politician.

References

1947 births
Living people
Dutch male rowers
Sportspeople from Delft
World Rowing Championships medalists for the Netherlands